Robert Wayne Pate (born December 3, 1953) is a former outfielder in Major League Baseball who played in 1980 and 1981 with the Montreal Expos.  Listed at 6' 3", 200 lb., he batted and threw right handed.

Career
Born in Los Angeles, California, Pate attended Arizona State University and Mesa Community College. He was selected by the Montreal Exposs in the fourth round of the 1976 MLB Draft.

Pate split his first three professional seasons between the Quebec Metros and Denver Bears before joining the big team.

His most productive season came in 1979, when he hit a slash line of .323/.383/.485 in 118 games with Denver, ending second in the Triple-A American Association batting race behind Keith Smith (.350), of the Springfield Redbirds, while ranking second in hits (157), ninth in total bases (220) and tenth in runs scored (85).

In part of two seasons with Montreal, Pate posted a .267 average with five runs batted in without a home run in 31 games.

Overall, Pate slashed .301/.380/.458 with 67 homers and 398 RBI in 693 minor league games from 1977–1983. In between, he played winter ball with the Cardenales de Lara club of the Venezuelan League during the 1979–1980 season.

Following his playing career, Pate coached for the Burlington Expos in 1987.

References

External links

1953 births
Living people
African-American baseball coaches
African-American baseball players
American expatriate baseball players in Canada
American expatriate baseball players in Italy
American expatriate baseball players in Venezuela
Arizona State Sun Devils baseball players
Baseball coaches from California
Baseball players from Los Angeles
Cardenales de Lara players
Denver Bears players
Grosseto Baseball Club players
Major League Baseball right fielders
Mesa Thunderbirds baseball players
Minor league baseball coaches
Montreal Expos players
Quebec Metros players
Tucson Toros players
21st-century African-American people
20th-century African-American sportspeople
Anchorage Glacier Pilots players
Compton High School alumni